Verkhneye Kerchevo is a rural locality (a settlement) in Cherdynsky District, Perm Krai, Russia. The population was 33 as of 2010. There are 2 streets.

Geography 
Verkhneye Kerchevo is located 94 km south of Cherdyn (the district's administrative centre) by road. Nizhneye Kerchevo is the nearest rural locality.

References 

Rural localities in Cherdynsky District